Fuscoptilia emarginatus is a moth of the family Pterophoridae. It is found in the Hokkaido, Honshu and Kyushu islands of Japan, the Kuril Islands, Korea, China and Amur. It is also known from Mongolia.

The length of the forewings is 8–12 mm.

The larvae feed on Lespedeza bicolor and Lespedeza cuneata. They feed on the leaf of the host plant and pupate on the under surface of a leaf, very rarely on the upper surface. The pupa directs to the petiole. The adult appears from May to September.

References

External links
Taxonomic And Biological Studies Of Pterophoridae Of Japan (Lepidoptera)
Japanese Moths

Exelastini
Moths of Japan
Moths described in 1884